Parklands is a suburb of Christchurch, New Zealand. It is located north east of the city centre near Bottle Lake Forest.

The area between Burwood Hospital and Waimairi Golf Club was occupied by a brickworks established by John Brightling (1842–1928). It was developed as a residential suburb from 1963.

Demographics

Parklands had a population of 10,242 at the 2018 New Zealand census, an increase of 441 people (4.5%) since the 2013 census, and an increase of 1,194 people (13.2%) since the 2006 census. There were 3,645 households. There were 5,058 males and 5,184 females, giving a sex ratio of 0.98 males per female, with 2,238 people (21.9%) aged under 15 years, 1,827 (17.8%) aged 15 to 29, 4,854 (47.4%) aged 30 to 64, and 1,326 (12.9%) aged 65 or older.

Ethnicities were 89.7% European/Pākehā, 12.5% Māori, 3.3% Pacific peoples, 4.3% Asian, and 1.8% other ethnicities (totals add to more than 100% since people could identify with multiple ethnicities).

The proportion of people born overseas was 17.2%, compared with 27.1% nationally.

Although some people objected to giving their religion, 57.7% had no religion, 32.6% were Christian, 0.6% were Hindu, 0.3% were Muslim, 0.4% were Buddhist and 1.6% had other religions.

Of those at least 15 years old, 1,284 (16.0%) people had a bachelor or higher degree, and 1,572 (19.6%) people had no formal qualifications. The employment status of those at least 15 was that 4,152 (51.9%) people were employed full-time, 1,329 (16.6%) were part-time, and 294 (3.7%) were unemployed.

Education
Parkview Pārua School and Queenspark School are state coeducational full primary schools catering for years 1 to 8. Both schools were founded in 1977.

References

Suburbs of Christchurch